Chiquita is an American large produce company

Chiquita may also refer to:

Literature
Chiquita, a novel about the life of Espiridiona Cenda, written by Antonio Orlando Rodríguez 2008

Music
"Chiquita", a song by Sam H. Stept
"Chiquita", a song by Aerosmith from Night in the Ruts
Chiquitas (song), a song by Ilona Mitrecey

People
Espiridiona Cenda (1869–1945), Cuban dwarf dancer and singer
Chiquita Barreto (born 1947), Paraguayan writer
Humberto González (born 1966), Mexican professional boxer
Delia Gonzalez (born 1971), American female professional boxer

Place
Chiquita River, located in Táchira, Venezuela

See also
"Chiquitita", a single by ABBA
Chicquita, a racehorse